PFK FAYUR Beslan was a Russian football club from Beslan, founded in 2010. It played in the Russian Second Division in 2010 and 2011/12 seasons, taking 6th spot in the South Zone in 2010.

In 2010 it played under the name FC Beslan-FAYUR Beslan.

Notes

External links
Profile on 2liga.ru

Association football clubs established in 2010
Association football clubs disestablished in 2012
Football clubs in Russia
Sport in North Ossetia–Alania
2010 establishments in Russia
2012 disestablishments in Russia